The Kendall River is a river located in Far North Queensland, Australia.

The headwaters of the river rise in the Great Dividing Range and flows in a south westerly direction through mostly uninhabited country across Cape York Peninsula. It eventually discharges into the Holroyd River near the Kulinchin Outstation and then onto the Gulf of Carpentaria.

History 
The traditional owners of the area are the Wik-Munkan and Mimungkun peoples. 

Kugu Nganhcara (also known as Wik, Wiknantjara, Wik Nganychara, Wik Ngencherr) is a traditional language of the area, which includes the landscape within the local government boundaries of the Cook Shire.

The river was named by the pastoralists, Francis Lascelles Jardine and Alexander William Jardine in 1863. It was originally known as Kendall Creek and was named after a poet friend of their surveyor, Thomas Henry Kendall.

See also

References

Rivers of Far North Queensland
Gulf of Carpentaria